Edward Hawk (February 22, 1888 – March 26, 1936) was a pitcher in Major League Baseball. He played for the St. Louis Browns in 1911.

References

External links

1888 births
1936 deaths
People from Barry County, Missouri
Major League Baseball pitchers
St. Louis Browns players
Joplin Miners players
Tulsa Oilers (baseball) players
Burlington Pathfinders players
Baseball players from Missouri
Cassville Tigers players
Rogers Rustlers players